Plutarco Haza (born 22 June 1972) is a Mexican actor raised in Mazatlán, Sinaloa.

Haza produced and hosted the children's news show, Bizbirije on Canal 11. During the show's final year broadcast in 1998, he married the Polish-born Mexican actress Ludwika Paleta; they have one son named Nicolás. The couple separated in 2008. Haza remarried in 2014.

In 2015, Haza received a National Film Award (Premio Nacional de Cinematografía) for his career.

Films
Hidalgo: La historia jamás contada (2010) as Spanish captive.

TV shows
Las Aparicio (2010) as Leonardo Villegas.
Lo que callamos las mujeres (episode Alas rotas December 3, 2001).

Telenovelas
El Señor de los Cielos (2016) as Dalvio Navarrete "El Ingeniero"En Otra Piel (2014) as  Carlos Ricalde / Raúl Camacho.Pobre Rico Pobre (2008) as Maximiliano López Ferreira.Mientras Haya Vida (2007)Mirada de mujer: El regreso (2003 and 2007)'' as Andrés San Millán.

References

External links
 

1972 births
Living people
21st-century Mexican male actors
Mexican male film actors
Mexican male telenovela actors
Mexican television producers
Mexican television presenters
People from Ciudad Obregón
People from Mazatlán
Male actors from Sonora
Male actors from Sinaloa